The genioglossus is one of the paired extrinsic muscles of the tongue. It is a fan-shaped muscle that comprises the bulk of the body of the tongue. It arises from the mental spine of the mandible; it inserts onto the hyoid bone, and the bottom of the tongue. It is innervated by the hypoglossal nerve (cranial nerve XII). The genioglossus is the major muscle responsible for protruding (or sticking out) the tongue.

Structure
Genioglossus is the fan-shaped extrinsic tongue muscle that forms the majority of the body of the tongue.

Origin 
It arises from the mental spine of the mandible.

Insertion 
Its insertions are the hyoid bone and the bottom of the tongue.

Innervation 
The genioglossus is innervated by the hypoglossal nerve, as are all muscles of the tongue except for the palatoglossus.

Blood supply 
Blood is supplied to the sublingual branch of the lingual artery, a branch of the external carotid artery.

Function
The left and right genioglossus muscles protrude the tongue and deviate it towards the opposite side. When acting together, the muscles depress the center of the tongue at its back.

Clinical significance
Contraction of the genioglossus stabilizes and enlarges the portion of the upper airway that is most vulnerable to collapse. Relaxation of the genioglossus and geniohyoideus muscles, especially during REM sleep, is implicated in obstructive sleep apnea. Given this connection, the mandible can be pulled forward to maximise the airway space, and prevent the tongue from sinking backwards under anaesthesia and obstructing the airway.

The genioglossus is often used as a proxy to test the function of the hypoglossal nerve, by asking a patient to stick out their tongue. Peripheral damage to the hypoglossal nerve can result in deviation of the tongue to the damaged side.

History
The name derives from the Greek words γένειον (geneion) meaning "chin", and γλῶσσα (glōssa) meaning "tongue." The earliest recorded mention is by Helkiah Crooke in the early seventeenth century.

Other animals 
The canine genioglossus muscle has been divided into horizontal and oblique compartments.

References

External links
 
 
 Frontal section

Muscles of the head and neck
Tongue